Ji Jianhua (born January 29, 1982, in Xinjiang) is a male Chinese Olympic cyclist, who has competed for Team China at the 2008 Summer Olympics.

Sports career
2000 Xinjiang Kuerle Athletics Team
2002 Anhui Provincial Cycling Team
2007 National Team
2008 Skil–Shimano

Major performances
2004 Mountain Bike National Championships – 1st
2005 National Games – 3rd mountain bike
2007 National Championships/Asian Championships – 1st mountain bike

References
 Profile  Beijing 2008 Team China

1982 births
Living people
Chinese male cyclists
Cyclists from Xinjiang
Cyclists at the 2008 Summer Olympics
Cross-country mountain bikers
Olympic cyclists of China
21st-century Chinese people